Össjö Castle is a manor house in Ängelholm Municipality in Scania, Sweden. The manor house, a two-story stone structure in Empire style, was built between 1814-1815 by Adolf Fredrik Tornérhielm. The  property  area is 1,400 hectares and covers both fields and woodland.

References

External links
Össjö gård website

See also
List of castles in Sweden

Manor houses in Sweden
Houses completed in 1815